Yana Ihorivna Shvets (born 2 April 1989), known by her stage names Eva Bushmina (2009—2016) and Layah (stylised in all capital letters, since 2016), is a Ukrainian singer, actress, television presenter and a former member of girl group Nu Virgos.

Life and career

Early years 
Yana Shvets was born on 2 April 1989, in Sverdlovsk, Luhansk Oblast.

Shvets graduated from Sverdlovsk School No.9. In 2001, she was admitted to the Variety and Circus Academy to the Variety Vocal Department in Kyiv.

2009—2010: Lucky and Fabrika Zvyozd 3 
Shvets was the lead singer of the group Lucky, was a backup vocalist for the Ukrainian singer NK and the band Aviator. 

Through a selection process, which took place in October 2009, out of thousands of contenders, she became a member of the Ukrainian show Fabryka Zirok where she adopted the pseudonym Eva Bushmina.

2010–2012: Nu Virgos 
On 21 March 2010, Bushmina announced her early separation from the show (Fabryka Zirok) and joined the Ukrainian girl group Nu Virgos where she replaced Tatiana Kotova. Bushmina made her debut as a member of the group on 30 March on the Ukrainian TV show "Вечерний квартал". Her debut single with Nu Virgos was "Пошёл Вон" (Go Away) which was released on 28 March. Nu Virgos then toured through Ukrainian cities with their show "ВИА-Графия". In September, the group released a new single "День Без Тебя" (A Day Without You) and in October, the video for it was released.

In February 2012, the group released a single "Алло, Мам" (Hello, Mom). In December, Bushmina left the group.

2013—2016: Solo career 
In January 2013, Bushmina recorded her first single "Собой" (Myself). The single was premiered on 22 March. On 4 July, the new single was released under the title "Лето напрокат" (Summer for hire). On 25 September, Bushmina released a new single "Религия" (Religion). In the middle of 2013, she was invited as a coach on the show "Хочу В ВИА Гру" (I Want To Be In VIA Gra) however, she refused due to a recent childbirth.

From 2014 to 2016, Bushmina released new singles such as "Как вода" (As Water), "Нельзя поменять" (Can't Change), "Не преступление" (Not a Crime) and "Тени" (Shadows) which were later included on her debut self-titled album "LAYAH".

2016—present: LAYAH 
On 25 April 2016, Bushmina announced that the project "Eva Bushmina" terminates its existence.

In September, she released her debut album "LAYAH" which consists of 11 tracks including (Как вода, Нельзя поменять, Не преступление and Тени).

In March 2017, Layah released the music video for the song "Не Прячься" (Don't Hide). On 27 November, Layah released an EP "Вне времени" (Timeless) In support of the album, a music video was filmed for the single "Молчать" (Silence) in Berlin. At the end of December, Layah released the video for the song Timeless.

On 1 June 2018, Layah released a song titled "NAZLO" (Out of Spite). On 21 June 2019, Layah released a house-inspired mini-album titled "Сам за себя" (For Yourself). In the Summer of 2021, she released a second EP titled "Drunk Promises".

Discography 

 2016 — LAYAH
 2017 — Вне времени — EP
 2019 —  Сам за себя — EP
 2021 — Drunk Promises — EP

Videography

with Lucky 

 2007 — За рекой
 2008 — Я больше не буду

with Nu Virgos 

 2010 — Пошёл Вон & День Без Тебя
 2012 — Алло, Мам

as solo artist 

 2013 — Собой, Лето напрокат & Религия
 2014 — #kakvod & Нельзя поменять
 2015 — Не преступление
 2016 — Тени, Невесомыми & Преданы
 2017 — Не прячься, Навсегда, Молчать & Вне Времени
 2018 — Ранена, NEO & NAZLO
 2019 — Изнанка
 2020 — End of Summer
 2021 — Мастер

References 

1989 births
Living people
People from Sverdlovsk, Luhansk Oblast
21st-century Ukrainian women singers
21st-century Ukrainian actresses
Ukrainian women television presenters
Ukrainian pop singers
Ukrainian rock singers
Nu Virgos members